Agnès Sorel (1422 – 9 February 1450), known by the sobriquet Dame de beauté (Lady of Beauty), was a favourite and chief mistress of King Charles VII of France, by whom she bore four daughters. She is considered the first officially recognized royal mistress of a French king. She was the subject of several contemporary paintings and works of art, including Jean Fouquet's Virgin and Child Surrounded by Angels.

Life in the royal court

Born in 1422, the daughter of Jean Soreau and Catherine de Maignelais, Sorel was 20 or 21 years old when she was first introduced to King Charles. At that time, she was holding a position in the household of Rene I of Naples, as a maid of honour to his consort Isabella, Duchess of Lorraine. Sorel then went on to serve as the lady-in-waiting for Marie d'Anjou, Charles VII of France's wife and Isabella's sister in law. She would soon become his mistress. The King gave her the Château de Loches (where he had been persuaded by Joan of Arc to be crowned King of France) as her private residence.

Soon, her presence was felt at the royal court in Chinon where her company was alleged to have brought the king out of a protracted depression. She had a very strong influence on the king, and that, in addition to her extravagant tastes, earned her powerful enemies at court. Sorel would become the first officially recognized royal mistress of a French king.

Sorel generated scandal at court, particularly for popularizing the fashion of low-cut gowns. This behavior was both imitated and scorned. Jean Juvénal des Ursins, the archbishop of Reims, counseled the king to correct such fashions as "front openings through which one sees the teats, nipples, and breasts of women" (ouvertures de par devant, par lesquelles on voit les tetins, tettes et seing des femmes).

Children and death
Agnès gave birth to four daughters fathered by the king:
Marie, possibly born the summer of 1444
Charlotte, who married Jacques de Brézé (their son, Louis de Brézé, seigneur d'Anet, in turn married Diane de Poitiers, a future royal mistress)
Jeanne

While pregnant with their fourth child, she journeyed from Chinon in midwinter to join Charles on the campaign of 1450 in Jumièges, wanting to be with him as moral support. There, she suddenly became ill, and after giving birth, she and her daughter died on 9 February 1450. She was 28 years old. While the cause of death was originally thought to be dysentery, French forensic scientist Philippe Charlier suggested in 2005 that Agnès died of mercury poisoning. He offered no opinion about whether she was murdered. Mercury was sometimes used in cosmetic preparations or to treat worms, and such use might have brought about her death. She was interred in the Church of St. Ours, in Loches. Her heart was buried in the Benedictine Abbey of Jumièges.

Charles' son, the future King Louis XI, had been in open revolt against his father for the previous four years. It has been speculated that he had Agnès poisoned in order to remove what he may have considered her undue influence over the king. It was also speculated that French financier, noble and minister Jacques Cœur poisoned her, though that theory is widely discredited as having been an attempt to remove Coeur from the French court.

Her cousin Antoinette de Maignelais took her place as mistress to the king after her death.

Legacy

Sorel plays a main part in Voltaire's poem La Pucelle. She is the subject of an 1836 opera named after her. Two Russian operas from the late 19th century also portray her, along with Charles VII: Pyotr Tchaikovsky's The Maid of Orleans and César Cui's The Saracen. 

She is also a featured figure on Judy Chicago's installation piece The Dinner Party, being represented as one of the 999 names on the Heritage Floor. Two garments use Sorel's name in their descriptors, Agnes Sorel bodice, Agnes Sorel corsage and a fashion style named after her as well, Agnes Sorel style, which is described as a "princess" style of dressing.

See also

List of unsolved deaths

References

Sources

Further reading

 
 Autheman, Marc. (2008). Agnès Sorel: l'inspiratrice. 
Desmondes, Tim. (2009). Agnes Sorel: The Breast And Crotch That Changed History. Austin: The Nazca Plains Corporation. 
D'Orliac, Jehanne. (1931). The Lady of Beauty: Agnes Sorel. First Royal Favourite of France. J.B. Lippincott Company. Translated by M.C. Darnton
 Duquesne. (1909). Vie et Aventures galantes de la belle Sorel. Paris
Goldsmid, Edmund. (2010). A King's Mistress: Or, Charles Vii. & Agnes Sorel and Chivalry in the Xv. Century, Volumes 1–2. Charleston: Nabu Press. 

1421 births
1450 deaths
15th-century French women
15th-century French people
Deaths in childbirth
French artists' models
French ladies-in-waiting
French maids of honour
Agnes
Mistresses of French royalty
People from Indre-et-Loire
Unsolved deaths